Käuzchenkuhle is an East German film. It was released in 1968.

Plot 
Jean-Paul Fontanon, known as Jampoll, comes from Berlin and travels to his grandparents in the country in Wolfsruh every year during the summer holidays. But this time everything is different. Grandfather doesn't pick him up. Already at the train station, he runs into a Mr. Kohlweis, who takes him to the village on his bike and sends his regards to his grandfather Kalmus. After Jampoll has passed the stranger's greetings, Kalmus is nervous and upset. 

Together with his friends Screw, Christian and Linde, Jampoll begins to spy on the mysterious Herr Kohlweis, who now works in a sawmill. They find out that Kohlweis used to be an officer in the SS and at the end of World War II in April 1945 he dumped a box of looted art in nearby Mummelsee. Jampoll's grandfather and the deaf-mute Gotthold were forced to help. They were then supposed to be killed, but managed to escape. They later came back to retrieve the box and hide it in the owlet den, which the villagers believed to be inhabited by ghosts. Gotthold died in the action and drowned, which Jampoll's grandfather never forgave. But the box is still stored in the little owl and Kohlweis has now returned to fetch the treasure.  

Jampoll and his friends report their investigations to the local section commissioner. When Kohlweis came to the Käuzchenkuhle with a friend and wanted to salvage the container, the police finally showed up to arrest both men. Kohlweis dies in the process.

External links
 

1968 films
East German films
1960s German-language films
German children's films
1960s German films